Niagara is a 1953 American film-noir thriller film directed by Henry Hathaway, produced by Charles Brackett, and written by Brackett, Richard L. Breen and Walter Reisch. The film stars Marilyn Monroe, Joseph Cotten, Jean Peters, and Max Showalter (credited as Casey Adams). It was one of 20th Century Fox's biggest box-office hits that year.

Unlike other films noir of the time, which were typically black-and-white, Niagara was filmed in "three-strip" Technicolor (one of the last films to be made at Fox in that format, as a few months later Fox began converting to CinemaScope, which had compatibility problems with three-strip but not with Eastmancolor).

Monroe was given top billing in Niagara, which elevated her to star status. Her next two films, Gentlemen Prefer Blondes (1953) and How to Marry a Millionaire (1953), were even bigger successes.

Plot
Ray and Polly Cutler, on a delayed honeymoon at Niagara Falls, find their reserved cabin occupied by George and Rose Loomis. Rose tells them that George is asleep and has recently been discharged from an Army mental hospital after his war service in Korea. The Cutlers politely but reluctantly accept another, less desirable cabin, and so the two couples become acquainted.

George and Rose have a very troubled and volatile marriage. She is younger and very attractive. He is jealous, depressed and irritable. While touring the Falls the following day, Polly sees Rose passionately kissing another man, her lover Patrick.

That evening, the Cutlers witness George's rage. Rose joins an impromptu party and requests that a record of her favorite song, "Kiss", be played. George storms out of their cabin and breaks the record, suspecting the song has a secret meaning for Rose. Seeing that George has cut his hand with the record, Polly visits his room to apply mercurochrome and bandages. George confides that he was a sheep rancher whose luck turned for the worse after he married Rose, whom he met when she was a barmaid.

The next day, Rose lures George into following her to the dark tourist tunnel underneath the Falls, where Patrick is waiting to kill him. To let Rose know that George is dead, Patrick will request the Rainbow Tower Carillon play "Kiss". When she hears the tune being played on the carillon bells, Rose concludes George is dead.

In fact, it is George who has killed Patrick, thrown his body into the Falls, and collected Patrick's shoes at the exit instead of his own. This leads the police to believe that George is the victim. The body is retrieved and the police bring Rose to identify George's body. When the cover is lifted from the face and she recognizes the dead man, she collapses before saying anything and is admitted to the hospital.

The motel manager moves the Cutlers' belongings to the Loomises' cabin. George comes to the cabin looking for Rose but finds Polly sleeping there instead. She wakes and sees him before he runs away. She tells the police, who launch a dragnet. During the Cutlers' second visit to the Falls, George finds Polly alone for a moment. Trying to escape, she slips, but he saves her from falling over the edge into the waterfall torrent. He explains to her that he killed Patrick in self-defense and begs her to "let me stay dead". Polly leaves without answering. Later that day, she tells the police detective that she believes George is alive. George has the carillon play "Kiss" again to panic Rose, who flees the hospital, intending to cross the border back to the United States. Finding George waiting at the border for her, she flees and tries to hide in the carillon bell tower. George catches her and strangles her beneath the bells, which remain silent. Realizing that he is locked in the building, he sits down next to her body and remorsefully tells her that he loved her.

The Cutlers go fishing with Ray's boss and his wife in a launch on a section of the Niagara River above the Falls. When the boat moors in Chippawa for gasoline and other supplies, George steals it with Polly on board. She tells him to give himself up as it was self-defense, but he tells her he cannot because he has killed Rose. The police set out in pursuit. The boat runs out of gas and drifts towards the Falls. As they near the edge, George scuttles the boat to slow it down and manages to get Polly onto a large rock before he goes over the Falls to his death. Polly is rescued from the rock by a U.S. Coast Guard helicopter.

Cast

Production
Walter Reisch said producer Charles Brackett wanted to make a film set around Niagara Falls and Reisch suggested it be a murder mystery. Reisch said, "Anybody hearing the name Niagara thinks of honeymoon couples and of some sentimental story of a girl walking out on her husband on their wedding night and their getting together again. It would be foolish to start up with Sonja Henie tricks here or Esther Williams-type swimming extravaganzas. I would like to make it a mystery story, with a real murder in it."

Reisch said he came up with the story but wrote the script with Richard Breen and Brackett.

Head of Fox Darryl F. Zanuck wanted to cast Monroe in the film. According to Reisch, "we thought that was a nice idea, until there came a second telephone call that he wanted her to be the villainess, not the girl... My God! Here was the prettiest girl in the whole United States of America! But he insisted it was a great idea, so we finally did it. We didn't know whether she would like it, but she had no objection, whatsoever—on the contrary."

Peters replaced Anne Baxter in the role of Polly. Shooting of Niagara took place from early June to mid-July 1952. Peters' character was initially the leading role, but the film eventually became a vehicle for Monroe, who was by that time more successful.

Reisch says there are "major sequences missing" from the final film. "After he'd seen it, Zanuck simply couldn't accept the fact that the police at Niagara Falls were of Canadian extraction. We had British actors playing Canadian police commissioners and detectives and various cops, and he just abhorred it. He wouldn't let us go back to the stages to finish it or to repair it—no, he just took it out! The American audience, he said, does not know, does not understand, that the Niagara Falls are bisected by the border . . . and we should have used Americans. And [director Henry] Hathaway, who didn't like the idea either, sided with him. So there are big holes in the story."

"Kiss" was composed by Lionel Newman, with lyrics by Haven Gillespie. Both are uncredited.

Reception

Critical response
Upon the film's release, A. W. of The New York Times praised the film, if not the acting, writing, "Obviously ignoring the idea that there are Seven Wonders of the World, Twentieth Century-Fox has discovered two more and enhanced them with Technicolor in Niagara... For the producers are making full use of both the grandeur of the Falls and its adjacent areas as well as the grandeur that is Marilyn Monroe... Perhaps Miss Monroe is not the perfect actress at this point. But neither the director nor the gentlemen who handled the cameras appeared to be concerned with this. They have caught every possible curve both in the intimacy of the boudoir and in equally revealing tight dresses. And they have illustrated pretty concretely that she can be seductive—even when she walks. As has been noted, Niagara may not be the place to visit under these circumstances but the falls and Miss Monroe are something to see."

Also in 1953, a reviewer at Variety wrote, "Niagara is a morbid, clichéd expedition into lust and murder. The atmosphere throughout is strained and taxes the nerves with a feeling of impending disaster. Focal point of all this is Marilyn Monroe, who's vacationing at the Falls with hubby Joseph Cotten.... The camera lingers on Monroe's sensuous lips, roves over her slip-clad figure and accurately etches the outlines of her derrière as she weaves down a street to a rendezvous with her lover. As a contrast to the beauty of the female form is another kind of nature's beauty—that of the Falls. The natural phenomena have been magnificently photographed on location."

Later critics have also praised the film. In 2001, Robert Weston wrote, "Niagara is a good movie for noir fans who crave something a little different. Be warned, the film was shot in glorious Technicolor, not black and white, but still boasts an ample share of shadows and style.... Undoubtedly, the best reason to see Niagara is just as trailer promised: for the scenery. There's some terrific location work that showcases the breathtaking aspects of the Falls before the city evolved into a tawdry Canadian answer to Atlantic City; and of course, there's a gal named Marilyn Monroe, burgeoning at her humble beginnings."

On the review aggregator website Rotten Tomatoes, the film holds an approval rating of 82% based on 22 reviews, with an average rating of 6.6/10.

Noir themes
A major theme is that of sex and its destructiveness. Rose is a femme fatale, seductively dressed in tight clothes revealing her sensual figure. Her relationship (combining the sexual, hypocritical, and scornful) with George is contrasted with the more normal relationship of the Cutlers, which also has sexual elements hinted at by the film. Ray Cutler does not fail to notice Rose's sexual charms, but his and Polly's reactions to their interactions with George and Rose demonstrate the conventionality of their attitudes.

Legacy
In the weeks after Monroe's death in August 1962, Andy Warhol used a publicity photo from Niagara as the basis for his silkscreen painting Marilyn Diptych.

References

External links

 
 
 
 
 
 

1953 films
1950s American films
1950s English-language films
1950s psychological thriller films
20th Century Fox films
American psychological thriller films
Color film noir
Films about adultery in the United States
Films directed by Henry Hathaway
Films produced by Charles Brackett
Films scored by Sol Kaplan
Films set in New York (state)
Films set in Ontario
Films shot in Ontario
Films with screenplays by Charles Brackett
Niagara Falls in fiction
Uxoricide in fiction